Constantine Constantinovich  may refer to:

 Grand Duke Konstantin Konstantinovich of Russia (22 August 1858 – 15 June 1915)
 Prince Constantine Constantinovich of Russia (1 January 1891 – 18 July 1918)